Rilly-la-Montagne station (French: Gare de Rilly-la-Montagne) is a railway station in the commune of Rilly-la-Montagne, Marne department, northern France. It is situated at kilometric point (KP) 160.734 on the Épernay-Reims railway and served by TER Grand Est trains operated by the SNCF.

In 2018, the SNCF estimated that the station served 64 498 passengers.

References 

Railway stations in Marne (department)